Tarenna is a genus of flowering plants in the family Rubiaceae. There are about 192 species distributed across the tropical world, from Africa, Asia, Australia to the Pacific Islands. They are shrubs or trees with oppositely arranged leaves and terminal arrays of whitish, greenish, or yellowish flowers.

Species
 Tarenna agumbensis Sundararagh.
 Tarenna drummondii Bridson
 Tarenna hoaensis Pit.
 Tarenna luhomeroensis Bridson
 Tarenna monosperma (Wight & Arn.) D.C.S.Raju
 Tarenna nilagirica (Bedd.) Bremek.
 Tarenna quadrangularis Bremek.
 Tarenna sechellensis (Baker) Summerh.

Image gallery

References

 
Rubiaceae genera
Taxonomy articles created by Polbot